Dominique Longo (born 12 January 1983) is a Swiss football defender, who currently plays for FC Frauenfeld.

References

1983 births
Living people
Swiss men's footballers
FC Wil players
FC Gossau players
FC St. Gallen players
Swiss Super League players
Association football defenders